Didissandra is a genus of flowering plants belonging to the family Gesneriaceae.

Its native range is Western Malesia.

Species:

Didissandra anisanthera 
Didissandra brachycarpa 
Didissandra elongata 
Didissandra frutescens 
Didissandra sprengelii 
Didissandra ternata 
Didissandra triflora 
Didissandra wildeana

References

Didymocarpoideae
Gesneriaceae genera